Dorstenia jamaicensis is a plant species in the family Moraceae.

It is endemic to Jamaica.

References

jamaicensis
Endemic flora of Jamaica
Plants described in 1908